The State Register of Heritage Places is maintained by the Heritage Council of Western Australia. , 197 places are heritage-listed in the Shire of Corrigin, of which four are on the State Register of Heritage Places.

List
The Western Australian State Register of Heritage Places, lists the following four state registered places within the Shire of Corrigin:

References

Corrigin
Corrigin